The 2022 Birmingham Classic (also known as the Rothesay Classic Birmingham for sponsorship reasons) was a women's tennis tournament being played on outdoor grass courts. It was the 40th edition of the event, and a WTA 250 tournament on the 2022 WTA Tour. It took place at the Edgbaston Priory Club in Birmingham, United Kingdom, on 13–19 June 2022.

Champions

Singles

  Beatriz Haddad Maia def.  Zhang Shuai, 5–4, ret. 

This is Haddad Maia's second title of the year and also her career.

Doubles

  Lyudmyla Kichenok /  Jeļena Ostapenko def.  Elise Mertens /  Zhang Shuai, by walkover

Points and prize money

Point distribution

Prize money 

1Qualifiers prize money is also the round of 32 prize money.
*per team

Singles main draw entrants

Seeds

 1 Rankings are as of 6 June 2022.

Other entrants
The following players received wildcards into the main draw:
  Katie Boulter
  Harriet Dart
  Petra Kvitová

The following players received entry from the qualifying draw:
  Jana Fett
  Rebecca Marino
  Caty McNally
  Lesia Tsurenko
  CoCo Vandeweghe
  Donna Vekić

The following player received entry as a lucky loser:
  Aleksandra Krunić

Withdrawal
Before the tournament
  Yulia Putintseva → replaced by  Kaja Juvan
  Emma Raducanu → replaced by  Dayana Yastremska
  Mayar Sherif → replaced by  Viktorija Golubic
  Sara Sorribes Tormo → replaced by  Petra Martić
  Sloane Stephens → replaced by  Caroline Garcia
  Clara Tauson → replaced by  Magdalena Fręch
  Ajla Tomljanović → replaced by  Aleksandra Krunić

Doubles main draw entrants

Seeds

1 Rankings are as of 6 June 2022.

Other entrants
The following pair received a wildcard into the doubles main draw:
  Harriet Dart /  Sarah Beth Grey

Withdrawals
Before the tournament
  Anna Danilina /  Beatriz Haddad Maia → replaced by  Alicia Barnett /  Olivia Nicholls
  Katarzyna Piter /  Kimberley Zimmermann → replaced by  Katarzyna Kawa /  Katarzyna Piter

References

External links 
 

2022 WTA Tour
2022
2022 in English tennis
Birmingham Classic